Brian Murphy may refer to:

Sportspeople
 Brian Murphy (Jamaican cricketer) (born 1973), Jamaican cricketer
 Brian Murphy (Zimbabwean cricketer) (born 1976), Zimbabwean cricketer
 Brian Murphy (baseball) (born 1980), American head baseball coach at the College of William & Mary
 Brian Murphy (Gaelic games) (born 1952), Irish former hurler and Gaelic footballer for Cork
 Brian Murphy (1990s Gaelic footballer), Irish former inter-county goalkeeper for Kerry and Dublin
 Brian Murphy (1960s Gaelic footballer) (born 1943), Irish former corner-back on the Cork senior football team
 Brian Murphy (Clonakilty Gaelic footballer) (born 1973), Irish Gaelic footballer
 Brian Murphy (hurler, born 1982) (born 1982), Irish former corner-back on the Cork senior hurling team
 Brian Murphy (ice hockey) (born 1947), played in one NHL game
 Brian Murphy (linesman), National Hockey League linesman, see 49th National Hockey League All-Star Game
 Brian Murphy (rugby union) (born 1985), Irish rugby player
 Brian Murphy (footballer, born 1983), Irish soccer player who was League of Ireland Goalkeeper of the Year 2008, now playing with Portsmouth

Others
 Brian Murphy (actor) (born 1932), British actor most noted for his role as George Roper in the sitcom George and Mildred
 Brian Murphy (broadcaster) (1941–2005), broadcaster and music historian at CHEZ-FM, 1977–1993
 Brian Murphy (musician), Irish multi-instrumentalist and engineer
 Brian Murphy (politician) (born 1961), former mayor of Moncton in New Brunswick, Canada
 Brian Murphy (scholar) (1923–2017), Irish scholar of Russian literature
 Brian Murphy (writer) (born 1959), American religion editor for the Associated Press
 Brian K. Murphy, American actor, producer, and writer
Brian Murphy (1981–2000), Irish student killed unlawfully outside Club Anabel in Dublin (see Death of Brian Murphy)
 Brian Murphy (intelligence official), U.S. Federal agent who served as Under Secretary of Homeland Security for Intelligence and Analysis
 Brian R. Murphy (born 1942), American virologist

See also
Bryan Murphy (disambiguation)